Choi Hwa-jeong (born February 10, 1961) is a  South Korean actress, radio presenter and television presenter. Her syndicated talk radio show Power Time, airs via SBS Power FM and its provincial affiliates since 1996.

Filmography

Film 

Source: Korean Movie Database

Television series 

Source: HanCinema

Television variety shows

Radio

References

External links

 
 
 

1961 births
Living people
South Korean television actresses
South Korean film actresses
South Korean stage actresses
South Korean radio presenters
South Korean television presenters
South Korean women television presenters
South Korean women radio presenters